Emir is a title of rulers or military leaders in many Muslim countries. Alternative spellings are Amir and Ameer.

Emir may also refer to:

 Emir (film), a 2010 Philippine film
 Emir (grape), a grape variety of Turkey
 Emir (name)
 Emir (singer) (born 1980), Turkish pop singer
 Emir, an album by Cem Adrian
 Əmir, a village in Azerbaijan
 European Market Infrastructure Regulation, a major body of securities market regulation for the European Union

See also
 Amir (disambiguation)
 Hammira (disambiguation)